The Distance may refer to:

 The distance (boxing), type of boxing match

Film and TV
 "The Distance" (The O.C.), a second season TV episode of The O.C.
 "The Distance" (The Walking Dead), a fifth season TV episode of The Walking Dead
 The Distance, a 2002 novel by Eddie Muller

Music
 The Distance (Bob Seger album), 1982
 The Distance (Taylor Hicks album), 2009
 The Distance, a 1987 album by Geoff Moore; also the name of Moore's backing band
 "The Distance" (Cake song), 1996
 The Distance (Mariah Carey song), 2018, featuring Ty Dolla Sign
 "The Distance", a song by Bon Jovi from the 2002 album Bounce
 "The Distance", a song by Live from the 1999 album The Distance to Here
 "The Distance", a song by Aly & AJ from the 2017 EP Ten Years

See also 
 Distance (disambiguation)